Razole is a town in Konaseema district of Andhra Pradesh, India. The town is surrounded by the river Vashishta (Godavari) and is known for its coconut and palm trees. Several Tollywood directors have used the region around Razole as a backdrop for films, including Ladies Tailor, Chanti, Kabaddi Kabaddi, and Vinayakudu. The resort of Dindi is located on the banks of the Godavari.

Razole has a good number of schools. ZP Boys high school is the oldest, celebrating its 100th year anniversary in 2018. Sobhana High school, Narayana e-Techno, Ravindra Bharathi, and Akshara are the most popular schools in the locality.

Sobhana and Ravindra Bharathi are the oldest of all these schools.  
When it comes to colleges in Razole, the town is home for colleges like Sri Chaitanya junior college, Narayana college, Andhrapradesh social welfare college (gurukul) and Government junior & degree college, Razole.

Notable people 
Sukumar: Director
Vamsy: Director
Anjali: Actress
Hema: character artist
Bandaru Ayyappa: IPL Cricketer represents Andhra in Ranji Trophy

Assembly
Razole is one of the 175 Assembly Constituencies in Andhra Pradesh. The current MLA is Rapaka Vara Prasad from Jana Sena Party.

References 

Villages in Razole mandal